Akanké FC is an African football club in Benin. They currently play in the Beninese Second Division after being relegated from the Benin Premier League in 2013.

Stadium
Currently the team plays at the Stade Municipal de Savalou. The stadium is able to hold 1,500 spectators.

League participations
 Benin Premier League: 2012–2013
 Benin Second Division: ?-2012, 2013–

References

External links
Soccerway

Football clubs in Benin